Statistics of Úrvalsdeild in the 1953 season.

Overview
It was contested by 6 teams, and ÍA won the championship. ÍA's Ríkharður Jónsson was the top scorer with 5 goals.

Group A

Group B

Final
ÍA 3-2 Valur

References

Úrvalsdeild karla (football) seasons
Iceland
Iceland
Urvalsdeild